Bocciardo is an Italian surname. Notable people with the surname include: 

Clemente Bocciardo (1620–1658), Italian painter
Domenico Bocciardo ( 1680–1746), Italian painter 
Francesco Bocciardo (born 1994), Italian Paralympic swimmer 

Italian-language surnames